Theater in America may refer to:

 Theater in the United States
 Theater in America, precursor of Great Performances TV series on PBS